Junior's Blues is an album by jazz pianist Junior Mance which was recorded in 1962 and released on the Riverside label.

Reception

The Allmusic site awarded the album 4½ stars stating "It's one of many consistently crafted works Mance would make over the years that mixed jazz and blues 50/50. Recommended".

Track listing
All compositions by Junior Mance except where noted.
 "Down the Line" - 4:58   
 "Creole Love Call" (Duke Ellington) - 3:19   
 "Rainy Mornin' Blues" - 4:00   
 "Yancey Special" (Meade Lux Lewis, Andy Razaf) - 3:01   
 "Gravy Waltz" (Steve Allen, Ray Brown) - 3:15   
 "Cracklin'" - 4:32   
 "In the Evening" (Leroy Carr, Don Raye) - 3:47   
 "Blue Monk" (Thelonious Monk) - 6:28   
 "The Jumpin' Blues" (Jay McShann, Charlie Parker) - 5:24

Personnel
Junior Mance - piano
Bob Cranshaw - bass
Mickey Roker - drums

References

 

1962 albums
Junior Mance albums
Riverside Records albums
Albums produced by Orrin Keepnews